Kishinoue's giant skink (Plestiodon kishinouyei), also known as the Japanese skink, is a species of skink, a lizard in the family Scincidae, endemic to the southern Ryukyu Islands of Japan.

The species name is a tribute to Japanese fisheries biologist Kamakichi Kishinouye (岸上 鎌吉, 1867–1929).

Description
Plestiodon kishinouyei is about 30–40 cm in total length (including tail), with a snout to vent length of 14.0–17.2 cm. It is the largest member of its widely distributed, speciose genus, and thus appears to be an example of island gigantism.

References

Endemic reptiles of Japan
Plestiodon
Reptiles described in 1901
Taxa named by Leonhard Stejneger
Taxonomy articles created by Polbot